is a Japanese manga series written and illustrated by Yukio Katayama. The manga was serialized in the Shogakukan publication Big Comic Spirits from 2015 to 2016. The series depicts the lifestyle of a 25-year-old office worker and bath lover Sayoko Oyumino.

It was adapted into a live-action drama which was broadcast on TV Tokyo in 2020 starring Hinako Sakurai.

Characters

A 25-year-old office worker that enjoys hot baths and tries various bathing methods to find the best bath.

A biker woman that is friends with Sayoko and sometimes travels on motorcycles with Sayoko to visit hot springs and bath houses.

A girl from Germany that befriends Sayoko and is not familiar with Japanese bathing customs.

A junior student from Sayako's college days. She has a very "bright and high-tension" personality and described as a shower person. which contrasts with Sayako. She is original to the live-action series.

Media

Manga
Furo Girl!, written and illustrated by Yukio Katayama, was serialized in Shogakukan's seinen manga magazine Big Comic Spirits from August 10, 2015, to November 21, 2016. Its chapters were collected in three tankōbon volumes, released from February 29, 2016, to February 28, 2017.

Volume list

Chapters not released in tankōbon
These two chapters were serialized in the Big Comic Spirits as chapters 3 and 7, but were omitted from the tankōbon releases changing the chapter numbers for the rest of the chapters in them.
003. 
007.

Live-action TV series
A live-action TV series aired from July 15, 2020, to August 20, 2020, starring Hinako Sakurai.

Episode list

See also
Hanamote Katare, another manga series by the same author
Yoake no Ryodan, another manga series by the same author

References

External links
 Official Site (Shogakukan) 
 
 Official Twitter 
 TV Tokyo 

2015 manga
2016 comics endings
2020 Japanese television series debuts
Bathing in Japan
Manga adapted into television series
Seinen manga
Shogakukan franchises
Shogakukan manga
Slice of life anime and manga
TV Tokyo original programming